Martina Hingis was the defending champion, but lost in semifinals to Conchita Martínez.

Conchita Martínez won the title by defeating Amanda Coetzer 6–1, 6–2 in the final.

Seeds
The first eight seeds received a bye into the second round.

Draw

Finals

Top half

Section 1

Section 2

Bottom half

Section 3

Section 4

References
 Official Results Archive (ITF)
 Official Results Archive (WTA)

WTA German Open - Singles
WTA German Open